Dr. Sbaitso     is an artificial intelligence speech synthesis program released late in 1991  by Creative Labs in Singapore for MS DOS-based personal computers. The name is an acronym for "SoundBlaster Acting Intelligent Text-to-Speech Operator."

History
Dr. Sbaitso was distributed with various sound cards manufactured by Creative Technology (the name was an acronym for Sound Blaster Acting Intelligent Text to Speech Operator) in the early 1990s.

The program "conversed" with the user as if it were a psychologist, though most of its responses were along the lines of "WHY DO YOU FEEL THAT WAY?" rather than any sort of complicated interaction.  When confronted with a phrase it could not understand, it would often reply with something such as "THAT'S NOT MY PROBLEM."  Dr. Sbaitso repeated text out loud that was typed after the word "SAY." Repeated swearing or abusive behavior on the part of the user caused Dr. Sbaitso to "break down" in a "PARITY ERROR" before resetting itself. The same would happen, if the user types "say parity."

The program introduced itself with the following lines:

 HELLO [UserName], MY NAME IS DOCTOR SBAITSO.
 
 I AM HERE TO HELP YOU.
 SAY WHATEVER IS IN YOUR MIND FREELY,
 OUR CONVERSATION WILL BE KEPT IN STRICT CONFIDENCE.
 MEMORY CONTENTS WILL BE WIPED OFF AFTER YOU LEAVE,
 
 SO, TELL ME ABOUT YOUR PROBLEMS.

The program was designed to showcase the digitized voices the cards were able to produce, though the quality was far from lifelike. Additionally, there was a version of this program for Microsoft Windows through the use of a program called Prody Parrot; this version of the software featured a more detailed graphical user interface.

Easter Eggs
If the user submits "HELP", a list of commands will appear.  If the user then submits "M", more commands will appear.  There are three pages of commands in total, with guidance on how to use each of the features.

See also
ALICE
ELIZA
History of natural language processing

References

External links 

1991 video games
Speech synthesis
Applications of artificial intelligence
DOS games
DOS-only games
Chatbots
Video games developed in Singapore